Red Passport (Italian: Passaporto rosso) is a 1935 Italian historical drama film directed by Guido Brignone and starring Isa Miranda, Filippo Scelzo and Ugo Ceseri. A group of Italian immigrants to South America join in a revolution.

It was shot at the Cines Studios in Rome and on location at Sabaudia in Lazio. The film's sets were designed by the art director Guido Fiorini.

The Italian dictator Benito Mussolini watched the film, and ordered some scenes to be altered as he felt the film was providing an example of revolutionary techniques to potential enemies of his Fascist regime.

Partial cast
 Isa Miranda as Maria Brunetti 
 Filippo Scelzo as Lorenzo Casati 
 Ugo Ceseri as Antonio Spinelli 
 Giulio Donadio as Don Pancho Rivera 
 Tina Lattanzi as Giulia Martini 
 Federico Collino as Luigi Martini 
 Olga Pescatori as Manuela Martini 
 Mario Pisu as Gianni Casati 
 Oreste Fares as Andrea Brunetti 
 Mario Ferrari as Don Pablo Ramirez 
 Carlo Ninchi as Un passeggero sul 'Santa Fe' 
 Flavio Díaz as Il capitano del 'Santa Fe' 
 Guglielmo Barnabò as Mr. Johnson
 Cele Abba as actress at the 'Café de Paris'

References

Bibliography 
 Gundle, Stephen. Mussolini's Dream Factory: Film Stardom in Fascist Italy. Berghahn Books, 2013.

External links 
 

1935 films
Italian historical drama films
Italian black-and-white films
1935 drama films
1930s historical drama films
1930s Italian-language films
Films directed by Guido Brignone
Films set in the 19th century
Films set in South America
Cines Studios films
1930s Italian films